Bohloul Alijani[1] (Persian: بهلول علیجانی) is an Iranian climatologist. He is the faculty member of  Kharazmi University in Iran.[2]

Professor Alijani was born in 1946 in Chehregan, a village in East Azarbaijan province.[3] He earned his high school diploma (in natural field) as a first honored student  in 1966 at Tasuj Jami high school. After He finished his military service, he was hired as a teacher in Firoozkooh in 1968. He completed his bachelor degree of physical geography at Kharazmi University (then called higher college of Tehran) in 1973. He was granted by Tehran higher college to continue his career at Michigan State University, East Lansing, MI. USA. From 1976 to 1981. After he earned his PhD degree in climatology from this university, he returned to Iran. In 1983 he was hired as assistant professor at Yazd higher college. Bohloul Alijani worked in Yazd college up to 1990. During this period he published his two accredited books of Principles of climatology and an introduction to field works in geography (translation). Both books were awarded by the ministry of science, research and technology in 1995. In 1990 professor Alijani moved to Kharazmi University (then called Tarbiat Moallem University) in Tehran. He was appointed as the dean of the college of Humanities from 1993 to 1999. At the same time he was the director of the Geography department for many years. In 1997 he was qualified to promotion for the full professor position in Geography and climatology. He has stablished the “ Center of Excellence for Spatial Analysis of Environmental Hazards”. He was the director of this center until he was retired in 2019. He is the director of the geography department at the “ center of study and publishing humanities books “SAMT” . He has cooperated with several scientific centers and societies such as Meteorological Organization of Iran, Iran National Science Foundation, programming committee of Ministry of science, research and technology. 
In March 2019 he was assigned by the president of Iran as one of the 20 national high ranking scientists to study the torrential floods of the country.

Prizes and Honors

1.Prize of the Book of the year for the books “ principles of climatology” and “introduction to the field methods in geography” in 1995. quantitative methodology in geography in 2021.

2.The exemplified professor of the country in 2005

3.In March 2012  a national ceremony was held by the Home of the humanities thoughters of the Ministry of science, research and technology to honor his scientific and academic activities.

4.The honored researcher of the country in 2017

Books
 
A. farsi
1.	Principles  of Climatology  ( co-authored  with  prof.  M. R.  Kaviani), SAMT  Organization,  Tehran, Iran, 1st  Published in 1992.  19th publication, 2016.       This   book has been selected  as the “ Book  of  Year  1995” and won the presidential prize. 
2.	Basics of Aerial Photography , Piame Noor  Univ. , Tehran , 1991.
3.	Climate of Iran ,  Piame Noor Univ., Tehran, 1995.
4.    Synoptic  Climatology,  SAMT.  Organisation, Tehran, 2002.fourth publication 20011. 5th Edition, 2012. 6th publication 2013.
5. Middle East and Arid Asia 1998. “ co-authored with O. Pilifosova and U.N.  Safriel, in: Watson, R.T., Zinyovera, M.C. and Moss, R.H. (eds), The regional impacts of climate change: Assessment of vulnerability, pp. 231- 252, WMO., Cambridge University Press, Cambridge.
6- The encyclopaedia of environmental hazards. 2013.  (chief editor). Center of Excellence for Spatial Analysis of Environmental Hazards, Kharazmi University, Tehran, Iran. 
7- Quantitative methodology in geography. 2019. SAMT.

B. Translation to Fars

1.  Lounsbury, J.F. and F.T. Aldrich, 1986, Introduction  to Geographic Field  Methods and Techniques, 2nd Edition, Bell and Howell  Company, London. Translated in 1992. This Book has been selected as the “accredited   Book of Year 1995”. 
2.	Boucher, K., 1976, Global Climate, Wiely, New York.  Translated in 1994.                                                                                             
3.	Zhenda, Z. and L. Shu, 1983,  Controlling  Desertification  in Arid and Semi-arid  Areas  in China, Desert  Research  Institute, Sinica Academy , Lanzhou , China. Translated  in  1989.

Research
 
Has published 207 papers in scientific journals; 25 of them are in English. 
Has finished 15 Research projects.
Has supervised 78 PhD dissertation and 184 MS theses.

References 

1946 births
Academic staff of Kharazmi University
People from Tehran
Iranian translators
20th-century translators
Living people
Academic staff of the University of Tehran
University of Freiburg alumni